The Twelve Tribes of Hattie is the 2012 debut novel of American author Ayana Mathis. In December 2012, the novel was selected for Oprah's Book Club 2.0. The Twelve Tribes of Hattie revolves around the matriarch of a black family of the Great Migration and her children and grandchildren.

References

External links
The Twelve Tribes of Hattie, official publisher website Knopf.

2012 American novels
American historical novels
2012 debut novels
Alfred A. Knopf books